Butinoline (Azulone) is an anticholinergic drug used as an antispasmodic.

References 

Alkyne derivatives
Muscarinic antagonists
Pyrrolidines